Horodyszcze may refer to the following places:

Belarus

Poland
Horodyszcze, Biała Podlaska County in Lublin Voivodeship
Horodyszcze, Chełm County in Lublin Voivodeship
Horodyszcze, Hrubieszów County in Lublin Voivodeship
Horodyszcze-Kolonia, Chełm County in Lublin Voivodeship

See also
 Horodyshche (disambiguation)